In enzymology, a 3-methyl-2-oxobutanoate dehydrogenase (ferredoxin) is an enzyme that catalyzes the chemical reaction

3-methyl-2-oxobutanoate + CoA + oxidized ferredoxin  S-(2-methylpropanoyl)-CoA + CO2 + reduced ferredoxin

The 3 substrates of this enzyme are 3-methyl-2-oxobutanoate, CoA, and oxidized ferredoxin, whereas its 3 products are S-(2-methylpropanoyl)-CoA, CO2, and reduced ferredoxin.

This enzyme belongs to the family of oxidoreductases, specifically those acting on the aldehyde or oxo group of donor with an iron-sulfur protein as acceptor.  The systematic name of this enzyme class is '''. Other names in common use include 2-ketoisovalerate ferredoxin reductase, 3-methyl-2-oxobutanoate synthase (ferredoxin), VOR, branched-chain ketoacid ferredoxin reductase, branched-chain oxo acid ferredoxin reductase, keto-valine-ferredoxin oxidoreductase, ketoisovalerate ferredoxin reductase, and 2-oxoisovalerate ferredoxin reductase'''.

References

 
 
 

EC 1.2.7
Enzymes of unknown structure